This is a list in alphabetical order of cricketers who have played for Tamil Union Cricket and Athletic Club in first-class matches. Where there is an article, the link comes before the club career span, and the scorecard name (typically initials and surname) comes after. If no article is present, the scorecard name comes before the span.

G
 Nisala Tharaka (2013–14 to 2015–16) : N. T. Gamage

H
 Dineth Thimodya (2016/17 to 2017/18) : D. T. Hewathantri

T
 W. A. Tavaré (2014–15)
 Pulina Tharanga (2012–13 to 2016–17) : D. H. A. P. Tharanga
 Avindu Theekshana (2018–19) : P. A. Theekshana
 D. S. Thilakaratne (2021–22 to 2022–23)
 Samith Tillakaratne (2000–01) : S. M. Tillakaratne
 Rally Tissera (1999–00 to 2006–07) : R. R. Tissera
 Y. N. Tillakaratne (2003–04)

References

Tamil Union Cricket and Athletic Club